The Ford Model U was a concept car created by Ford. This vehicle was first introduced at the 2003 North American International Auto Show. This concept is one of a kind with its automatic features and recyclability. Ford wanted this vehicle to be a modern 21st century interpretation to the original Ford Model T.

Engine
The Model U uses a 2.3-liter, four-cylinder supercharged, intercooled hydrogen internal combustion I4 engine which also uses a hybrid electric transmission. With this type of engine and transmission, this engine lived up to PZEV standards.

Design
The Model U's exterior is soy-based and the interior is highly automated. It has a power-retractable canvas roof and can go from an SUV to a pickup truck with its automatic retractable behind. The interior features a slot system to reduce clutter.

References

Ford Model U Information @ ConceptCarz.com
Model U Concept: A Model for Change Detailed article on Ford site
Ford's Model U For Change: An exclusive EV World interview with Ford Model U project engineers

Model U